Indalo is a Bangladeshi rock superband formed in 2012.

Members 

Indalo was formed by vocalist and guitarist Jon Kabir from Black, guitarist and vocalist Zubair Hasan from Aashor, bassist Ahsan Titu from Aashor and Black and drummer Dio Haque from the band, Nemesis.

Titu left the band after recording their first single, "ISD" with them. He was replaced by Bart Nandit Areng. After a sudden heart attack and a stroke, Dio Haque took a break from playing drums. Dio haque was the primary drummer of nemesis and stopped playing drums professionally.Mubarak Milon played the role of the drummer and played drums on "Miththa". Later Quazi Farhan replaced him and now playing drums with them as the fourth member.

History 
After leaving Black, Jon Kabir would frequently visit jamming sessions with Aashor, where Zubair and Titu would be jamming together. Titu was an active member of Black at the time and Zubair came out of a roughly four-year hiatus. Three of them decided to jam together and found Dio as the drummer. This soon became Indalo and they wrote their first single, "ISD". They first appeared before audience on the 10th of November in 2012 and rocked the curious new audience who attended the concert. There they performed "ISD" for the first time.

"ISD" was recorded and released in 2013. It became a huge hit after the release and until date it's one of their major hits. The song was also one of the 13 tracks on Kokhon Kibhabe Ekhane Ke Jane, their first album, which was released in 2015. "ISD" was recorded with Titu on bass; Bart played bass on the remainder of the album.

In concerts they have frequently played their own material as well as covers of international rock bands such as Soundgarden, Radiohead, Alice in Chains, Stone Temple Pilots, Pearl Jam and many others. They arranged many successful tribute concerts which were one of their kinds in the local underground concert scene.

In 2017, they released the single “Chhobi” under the record label of Gaanchill Music. The song came with a big budget music video shot at Bandarban, directed by the national award-winning director, Taneem Rahman Aungshu. In 2018 they released another single, "Hobeki?" which had elements of grunge, psychedelia and alternative rock in an extraordinary format far from the conventional verses and choruses. The track features Zubair's unconventional guitar tones and elements, Jon's powerful falsetto and belting, Dio's ‘other’ persona as a drummer and Bart's powerful bass. This track sealed the band as unpredictable, loved by their niche but faithful fans. Although they released the audio first, later they released the music video for the song.

In 2019, they released the first single “1996” from their much awaited EP, “Notun Khaame Purono Chithi”. The concept of the EP was to rediscover and remake old songs and give homage to the local music that the members grew up listening to. “1996” is a mishmash of the legends of LRB's ‘Kichu Chaibona’ and Ark's ‘Sweetie’ - both of which were released in the year of 1996. This single became a huge hit after the release and with million views on YouTube, the band reached a new set of audience.

“Miththa” was the second release fr the EP. “1996” was the last released track where Dio played drums with the band. Mubarak Milon from the band Banglamotorr, played drums on “Miththa” which is an original Black song. The song took a new shape and sound welcomed and enjoyed by the fans. The music video of ‘Miththa’ is basically a pre-sequel of the ‘1996’ video.

Third release from the EP, “Nei Proyojon” is originally by the heavy metal/progressive rock band Warfaze. The new rendition is a sludgy, grunge track played on acoustic instruments that has an unavoidable Indalo sound to it.

They soon announced the name of their second album, “Uttor Khujchi Dokkhine” and released the single “Kokhon Kibhabe Ekhane Ke Jane” from the upcoming album on September 24, 2021. Both the song and the music video got an excellent response from the fans who welcomed the new direction in the sound designing of the evolving band. Quazi Farhan debuted as the drummer with this track. Currently the band is working on their second album.

Discography 
Studio albums

 Kokhon Kibhabe Ekhane Ke Jane, (debut album, 2015)

Singles

 Chhobi (Single, Nov, 2017)
 Hobeki (Single, Aug, 2018)
 1996 (Single, Jun, 2019)
 Miththa (Single, August, 2019)
 Nei Proyojon ( Single, Jun, 2020)
 Kokhon Kibhabe Ekhane Ke Jane (Single, Sept 24, 2021)

EP
Notun Khaame Purono Chithi (EP, April 9, 2021)

Members 

Present members
 Jon Kabir - lead vocals, rhythm guitar (2012–present)
 Zubair Hasan - lead guitar, backing vocals (2012–present)
 Bart Nandit Areng - bass (2013–present)
 Quazi Farhan - drums (2021–present)

Past members
 Rafiqul Ahsan Titu - bass (2012-2013)
Dio Haque - drums (2012 - 2019)
Mubarak Hossain Milon - drums (2019 - 2020)

References 

2012 establishments in Bangladesh
Bangladeshi rock music groups